Artificial photosynthesis is a chemical process that biomimics the natural process of photosynthesis to convert sunlight, water, and carbon dioxide into carbohydrates and oxygen. The term artificial photosynthesis is commonly used to refer to any scheme for capturing and storing the energy from sunlight in the chemical bonds of a fuel (a solar fuel). Photocatalytic water splitting converts water into hydrogen and oxygen and is a major research topic of artificial photosynthesis. Light-driven carbon dioxide reduction is another process studied that replicates natural carbon fixation.

Research on this topic includes the design and assembly of devices for the direct production of solar fuels, photoelectrochemistry and its application in fuel cells, and the engineering of enzymes and photoautotrophic microorganisms for microbial biofuel and biohydrogen production from sunlight.

Overview 
The photosynthetic reaction can be divided into two half-reactions of oxidation and reduction, both of which are essential to producing fuel. In plant photosynthesis, water molecules are photo-oxidized to release oxygen and protons. The second phase of plant photosynthesis (also known as the Calvin-Benson cycle) is a light-independent reaction that converts carbon dioxide into glucose (fuel). Researchers of artificial photosynthesis are developing photocatalysts that are able to perform both of these reactions. Furthermore, the protons resulting from water splitting can be used for hydrogen production. These catalysts must be able to react quickly and absorb a large percentage of the incident solar photons.

Whereas photovoltaics can provide energy directly from sunlight, the inefficiency of fuel production from photovoltaic electricity (indirect process) and the fact that sunshine is not constant throughout the day sets a limit to its use. 
One way of using natural photosynthesis is for the production of a biofuel, which is an indirect process that suffers from low energy conversion efficiency (due to photosynthesis' own low efficiency in converting sunlight to biomass), the cost of harvesting and transporting the fuel, and conflicts due to the increasing need of land mass for food production. 
The purpose of artificial photosynthesis is to produce a fuel from sunlight that can be stored conveniently and used when sunlight is not available, by using direct processes, that is, to produce a solar fuel. With the development of catalysts able to reproduce the major parts of photosynthesis, water and sunlight would ultimately be the only needed sources for clean energy production. The only by-product would be oxygen, and production of a solar fuel has the potential to be cheaper than gasoline.

One process for the creation of a clean and affordable energy supply is the development of photocatalytic water splitting under solar light. This method of sustainable hydrogen production is a major objective for the development of alternative energy systems. 
It is also predicted to be one of the more, if not the most, efficient ways of obtaining hydrogen from water. 
The conversion of solar energy into hydrogen via a water-splitting process assisted by photosemiconductor catalysts is one of the most promising technologies in development. 
This process has the potential for large quantities of hydrogen to be generated in an ecologically sound manner. The conversion of solar energy into a clean fuel (H2) under ambient conditions is one of the greatest challenges facing scientists in the twenty-first century.

Two methods are generally recognized for the construction of solar fuel cells for hydrogen production:

A homogeneous system is one such that catalysts are not compartmentalized, that is, components are present in the same compartment. This means that hydrogen and oxygen are produced in the same location. This can be a drawback, since they compose an explosive mixture, demanding gas product separation. Also, all components must be active in approximately the same conditions (e.g., pH).
A heterogeneous system has two separate electrodes, an anode and a cathode, making possible the separation of oxygen and hydrogen production. Furthermore, different components do not necessarily need to work in the same conditions. However, the increased complexity of these systems makes them harder to develop and more expensive.

Another area of research within artificial photosynthesis is the selection and manipulation of photosynthetic microorganisms, namely green microalgae and cyanobacteria, for the production of solar fuels. Many strains are able to produce hydrogen naturally, and scientists are working to improve them. Algae biofuels such as butanol and methanol are produced both at laboratory and commercial scales. This method has benefited from the development of synthetic biology, which is also being explored by the J. Craig Venter Institute to produce a synthetic organism capable of biofuel production. 
In 2017, an efficient process was developed to produce acetic acid from carbon dioxide using "cyborg bacteria".

History 
Artificial photosynthesis was first anticipated by the Italian chemist Giacomo Ciamician during 1912. In a lecture that was later published in Science he proposed a switch from the use of fossil fuels to radiant energy provided by the sun and captured by technical photochemistry devices. In this switch he saw a possibility to lessen the difference between the rich north of Europe and poor south and ventured a guess that this switch from coal to solar energy would "not be harmful to the progress and to human happiness."

During the late 1960s, Akira Fujishima discovered the photocatalytic properties of titanium dioxide, the so-called Honda-Fujishima effect, which could be used for hydrolysis.

Visible light water splitting with a one piece multijunction semiconductor device (vs. UV light with titanium dioxide semiconductors) was first demonstrated and patented by William Ayers at Energy Conversion Devices during 1983. This group demonstrated water photolysis into hydrogen and oxygen, now referred to as an "artificial leaf" with a low cost, thin film amorphous silicon multijunction sheet immersed directly in water. Hydrogen evolved on the front amorphous silicon surface decorated with various catalysts while oxygen evolved from the back side metal substrate which also eliminated the hazard of mixed hydrogen/oxygen gas evolution. A polymer membrane above the immersed device provided a path for proton transport. The higher photovoltage available from the multijunction thin film device with visible light was a major advance over previous photolysis attempts with UV or other single junction semiconductor photoelectrodes. The group's patent also lists several other semiconductor multijunction compositions in addition to amorphous silicon.

The Swedish Consortium for Artificial Photosynthesis, the first of its kind, was established during 1994 as a collaboration between groups of three different universities, Lund, Uppsala and Stockholm, being presently active around Lund and the Ångström Laboratories in Uppsala. The consortium was built with a multidisciplinary approach to focus on learning from natural photosynthesis and applying this knowledge in biomimetic systems.

Research of artificial photosynthesis is experiencing a boom at the beginning of the 21st century. During 2000, Commonwealth Scientific and Industrial Research Organisation (CSIRO) researchers publicized their intent to emphasize carbon dioxide capture and its conversion to hydrocarbons. In 2003, the Brookhaven National Laboratory announced the discovery of an important intermediate part of the reduction of CO2 to CO (the simplest possible carbon dioxide reduction reaction), which could result in better catalysts.

One of the disadvantages of artificial systems for water-splitting catalysts is their general reliance on scarce, expensive elements, such as ruthenium or rhenium. During 2008, with the funding of the United States Air Force Office of Scientific Research, MIT chemist and director of the Solar Revolution Project Daniel G. Nocera and postdoctoral fellow Matthew Kanan attempted to circumvent this problem by using a catalyst containing the cheaper and more abundant elements cobalt and phosphate. The catalyst was able to split water into oxygen and protons using sunlight, and could potentially be coupled to a hydrogen gas producing catalyst such as platinum. Furthermore, while the catalyst broke down during catalysis, it could self-repair. This experimental catalyst design was considered a major improvement by many researchers.

Whereas CO is the prime reduction product of CO2, more complex carbon compounds are usually desired. During 2008, Andrew B. Bocarsly reported the direct conversion of carbon dioxide and water to methanol using solar energy in a very efficient photochemical cell.

While Nocera and coworkers had accomplished water splitting to oxygen and protons, a light-driven process to produce hydrogen is desirable. During 2009, the Leibniz Institute for Catalysis reported inexpensive iron carbonyl complexes able to do just that. During the same year, researchers at the University of East Anglia also used iron carbonyl compounds to achieve photoelectrochemical hydrogen production with 60% efficiency, this time using a gold electrode covered with layers of indium phosphide to which the iron complexes were linked. Both of these processes used a molecular approach, where discrete nanoparticles are responsible for catalysis.

During 2009, F. del Valle and K. Domen showed the effect of the thermal treatment in a closed atmosphere using  photocatalysts.  solid solution reports high activity in hydrogen production from water splitting under sunlight irradiation. A mixed heterogeneous/molecular approach by researchers at the University of California, Santa Cruz, during 2010, using both nitrogen-doped and cadmium selenide quantum dots-sensitized titanium dioxide nanoparticles and nanowires, also yielded photoproduced hydrogen.

Artificial photosynthesis remained an academic field for many years. However, in the beginning of 2009, Mitsubishi Chemical Holdings was reported to be developing its own artificial photosynthesis research by using sunlight, water and carbon dioxide to "create the carbon building blocks from which resins, plastics and fibers can be synthesized." This was confirmed with the establishment of the KAITEKI Institute later that year, with carbon dioxide reduction through artificial photosynthesis as one of the main goals.

During 2010, the United States Department of Energy established, as one of its Energy Innovation Hubs, the Joint Center for Artificial Photosynthesis. The mission of JCAP is to find a cost-effective method to produce fuels using only sunlight, water, and carbon-dioxide as inputs.  JCAP is managed by a team from the California Institute of Technology (Caltech), directed by Professor Nathan Lewis and brings together more than 120 scientists and engineers from Caltech and its main partner, Lawrence Berkeley National Laboratory. JCAP also draws on the expertise and capabilities of key partners from Stanford University, the University of California at Berkeley, UCSB, University of California, Irvine, and University of California at San Diego, and the Stanford Linear Accelerator.  Additionally, JCAP serves as a central hub for other solar fuels research teams across the United States, including 20 DOE Energy Frontier Research Center.  The program has a budget of $122M over five years, subject to Congressional appropriation

Also during 2010, a team directed by professor David Wendell at the University of Cincinnati successfully demonstrated photosynthesis in an artificial construct consisting of enzymes suspended in a foam housing.

During 2011, Daniel Nocera and his research team announced the creation of the first practical artificial leaf.  In a speech at the 241st National Meeting of the American Chemical Society, Nocera described an advanced solar cell the size of a poker card capable of splitting water into oxygen and hydrogen, approximately ten times more efficient than natural photosynthesis. 
The cell is mostly made of inexpensive materials that are widely available, works under simple conditions, and shows increased stability over previous catalysts: in laboratory studies, the authors demonstrated that an artificial leaf prototype could operate continuously for at least forty-five hours without a drop in activity. In May 2012, Sun Catalytix, the startup based on Nocera's research, stated that it will not be scaling up the prototype as the device offers few savings over other ways to make hydrogen from sunlight. 
Leading experts in the field have supported a proposal for a Global Project on Artificial Photosynthesis as a combined energy security and climate change solution. 
Conferences on this theme have been held at Lord Howe Island during 2011, at Chicheley Hall in the UK in 2014 and at Canberra and Lord Howe island during 2016.

Current research 
In energy terms, natural photosynthesis can be divided in three steps:
 Light-harvesting complexes in bacteria and plants capture photons and transduce them into electrons, injecting them into the photosynthetic chain.
 Proton-coupled electron transfer along several cofactors of the photosynthetic chain, causing local, spatial charge separation.
 Redox catalysis, which uses the aforementioned transferred electrons to oxidize water to dioxygen and protons; these protons can in some species be utilized for dihydrogen production.

Using biomimetic approaches, artificial photosynthesis tries to construct systems doing the same type of processes. Ideally, a triad assembly could oxidize water with one catalyst, reduce protons with another and have a photosensitizer molecule to power the whole system. One of the simplest designs is where the photosensitizer is linked in tandem between a water oxidation catalyst and a hydrogen evolving catalyst:
 The photosensitizer transfers electrons to the hydrogen catalyst when hit by light, becoming oxidized in the process.
 This drives the water splitting catalyst to donate electrons to the photosensitizer. In a triad assembly, such a catalyst is often referred to as a donor. The oxidized donor is able to perform water oxidation.
The state of the triad with one catalyst oxidized on one end and the second one reduced on the other end of the triad is referred to as a charge separation, and is a driving force for further electron transfer, and consequently catalysis, to occur. The different components may be assembled in diverse ways, such as supramolecular complexes, compartmentalized cells, or linearly, covalently linked molecules.

Research into finding catalysts that can convert water, carbon dioxide, and sunlight to carbohydrates or hydrogen is a current, active field. By studying the natural oxygen-evolving complex (OEC), researchers have developed catalysts such as the "blue dimer" to mimic its function. However, these catalysts are still inefficient.

Photoelectrochemical cells that reduce carbon dioxide into carbon monoxide (CO), formic acid (HCOOH) and methanol (CH3OH) are under development. Similar to natural photosynthesis, such artificial leaves can use a tandem of light absorbers for overall water splitting or CO2 reduction. These integrated systems can be assembled on lightweight, flexible substrates, resulting in floating devices resembling lotus leaves.

Phycobilitproteins from algae are under development for renewable energy production.

Hydrogen catalysts 
Hydrogen is the simplest solar fuel to synthesize, since it involves only the transference of two electrons to two protons. It must, however, be done stepwise, with formation of an intermediate hydride anion:
2 e− + 2 H+   H+ + H−  H2
The proton-to-hydrogen converting catalysts present in nature are hydrogenases. These are enzymes that can either reduce protons to molecular hydrogen or oxidize hydrogen to protons and electrons. Spectroscopic and crystallographic studies spanning several decades have resulted in a good understanding of both the structure and mechanism of hydrogenase catalysis. Using this information, several molecules mimicking the structure of the active site of both nickel-iron and iron-iron hydrogenases have been synthesized. Other catalysts are not structural mimics of hydrogenase but rather functional ones. Synthesized catalysts include structural H-cluster models, a dirhodium photocatalyst, and cobalt catalysts.

Water-oxidizing catalysts 
Water oxidation is a more complex chemical reaction than proton reduction. In nature, the oxygen-evolving complex performs this reaction by accumulating reducing equivalents (electrons) in a manganese-calcium cluster within photosystem II (PS II), then delivering them to water molecules, with the resulting production of molecular oxygen and protons:
2 H2O → O2 + 4 H+ + 4e−

Without a catalyst (natural or artificial), this reaction is very endothermic, requiring high temperatures (at least 2500 K).

The exact structure of the oxygen-evolving complex has been hard to determine experimentally. As of 2011, the most detailed model was from a 1.9 Å resolution crystal structure of photosystem II. The complex is a cluster containing four manganese and one calcium ions, but the exact location and mechanism of water oxidation within the cluster is unknown. Nevertheless, bio-inspired manganese and manganese-calcium complexes have been synthesized, such as [Mn4O4] cubane-type clusters, some with catalytic activity.

Some ruthenium complexes, such as the dinuclear µ-oxo-bridged "blue dimer" (the first of its kind to be synthesized), are capable of light-driven water oxidation, thanks to being able to form high valence states. In this case, the ruthenium complex acts as both photosensitizer and catalyst. This complexes and other molecular catalysts still attract researchers in the field, having different advantages such as clear structure, active site, and easy to study mechanism. One of the main challenges to overcome is their short-term stability and their effective heterogenization for applications in artificial photosynthesis devices.

Many metal oxides have been found to have water oxidation catalytic activity, including ruthenium(IV) oxide (RuO2), iridium(IV) oxide (IrO2), cobalt oxides (including nickel-doped Co3O4), manganese oxide (including layered MnO2 (birnessite), Mn2O3), and a mix of Mn2O3 with CaMn2O4. Oxides are easier to obtain than molecular catalysts, especially those from relatively abundant transition metals (cobalt and manganese), but suffer from low turnover frequency and slow electron transfer properties, and their mechanism of action is hard to decipher and, therefore, to adjust.

Recently Metal-Organic Framework (MOF)-based materials have been shown to be a highly promising candidate for water oxidation with first row transition metals. The stability and tunability of this system is projected to be highly beneficial for future development.

Photosensitizers 

Nature uses pigments, mainly chlorophylls, to absorb a broad part of the visible spectrum. Artificial systems can use either one type of pigment with a broad absorption range or combine several pigments for the same purpose.

Ruthenium polypyridine complexes, in particular tris(bipyridine)ruthenium(II) and its derivatives, have been extensively used in hydrogen photoproduction due to their efficient visible light absorption and long-lived consequent metal-to-ligand charge transfer excited state, which makes the complexes strong reducing agents. Other noble metal-containing complexes used include ones with platinum, rhodium and iridium.

Metal-free organic complexes have also been successfully employed as photosensitizers. Examples include eosin Y and rose bengal. Pyrrole rings such as porphyrins have also been used in coating nanomaterials or semiconductors for both homogeneous and heterogeneous catalysis.

As part of current research efforts artificial photonic antenna systems are being studied to determine efficient and sustainable ways to collect light for artificial photosynthesis. Gion Calzaferri (2009) describes one such antenna that uses zeolite L as a host for organic dyes, to mimic plant's light collecting systems. The antenna is fabricated by inserting dye molecules into the channels of zeolite L. The insertion process, which takes place under vacuum and at high temperature conditions, is made possible by the cooperative vibrational motion of the zeolite framework and of the dye molecules. The resulting material may be interfaced to an external device via a stopcock intermediate.

Carbon dioxide reduction catalysts 
In nature, carbon fixation is done by green plants using the enzyme RuBisCO as a part of the Calvin cycle. RuBisCO is a rather slow catalyst compared to the vast majority of other enzymes, incorporating only a few molecules of carbon dioxide into ribulose-1,5-bisphosphate per minute, but does so at atmospheric pressure and in mild, biological conditions. The resulting product is further reduced and eventually used in the synthesis of glucose, which in turn is a precursor to more complex carbohydrates, such as cellulose and starch. The process consumes energy in the form of ATP and NADPH.

Artificial CO2 reduction for fuel production aims mostly at producing reduced carbon compounds from atmospheric CO2. Some transition metal polyphosphine complexes have been developed for this end; however, they usually require previous concentration of CO2 before use, and carriers (molecules that would fixate CO2) that are both stable in aerobic conditions and able to concentrate CO2 at atmospheric concentrations haven't been yet developed. The simplest product from CO2 reduction is carbon monoxide (CO), but for fuel development, further reduction is needed, and a key step also needing further development is the transfer of hydride anions to CO.

Photobiological production of fuels 
Some photoautotrophic microorganisms can, under certain conditions, produce hydrogen. Nitrogen-fixing microorganisms, such as filamentous cyanobacteria, possess the enzyme nitrogenase, responsible for conversion of atmospheric N2 into ammonia; molecular hydrogen is a byproduct of this reaction, and is many times not released by the microorganism, but rather taken up by a hydrogen-oxidizing (uptake) hydrogenase. One way of forcing these organisms to produce hydrogen is then to annihilate uptake hydrogenase activity. This has been done on a strain of Nostoc punctiforme: one of the structural genes of the NiFe uptake hydrogenase was inactivated by insertional mutagenesis, and the mutant strain showed hydrogen evolution under illumination.

Many of these photoautotrophs also have bidirectional hydrogenases, which can produce hydrogen under certain conditions. However, other energy-demanding metabolic pathways can compete with the necessary electrons for proton reduction, decreasing the efficiency of the overall process; also, these hydrogenases are very sensitive to oxygen.

Several carbon-based biofuels have also been produced using cyanobacteria, such as 1-butanol.

Synthetic biology techniques are predicted to be useful for this topic. Microbiological and enzymatic engineering have the potential of improving enzyme efficiency and robustness, as well as constructing new biofuel-producing metabolic pathways in photoautotrophs that previously lack them, or improving on the existing ones. Another topic being developed is the optimization of photobioreactors for commercial application.

Food production 
Researchers have achieved controlled growth of diverse foods in the dark . It may become a way to increase energy efficiency of food production and reduce its environmental impacts. However, it is unclear if food production mechanisms based on the experimental process are viable and can be scaled.

Employed research techniques 
Research in artificial photosynthesis is necessarily a multidisciplinary topic, requiring a multitude of different expertise. Some techniques employed in making and investigating catalysts and solar cells include:
Organic and inorganic chemical synthesis.
Electrochemistry methods, such as photoelectrochemistry, cyclic voltammetry, electrochemical impedance spectroscopy, dielectric spectroscopy and bulk electrolysis.
Spectroscopic methods:
fast techniques, such as time-resolved spectroscopy and ultrafast laser spectroscopy;
magnetic resonance spectroscopies, such as nuclear magnetic resonance, electron paramagnetic resonance;
X-ray spectroscopy methods, including x-ray absorption such as XANES and EXAFS, but also x-ray emission.
Crystallography.
Molecular biology, microbiology and synthetic biology methodologies.

Advantages, disadvantages, and efficiency
Advantages of solar fuel production through artificial photosynthesis include:
 The solar energy can be immediately converted and stored. In photovoltaic cells, sunlight is converted into electricity and then converted again into chemical energy for storage, with some necessary losses of energy associated with the second conversion.
 The byproducts of these reactions are environmentally friendly. Artificially photosynthesized fuel would be a carbon-neutral source of energy, which could be used for transportation or homes.

Disadvantages include:
 Materials used for artificial photosynthesis often corrode in water, so they may be less stable than photovoltaics over long periods of time. Most hydrogen catalysts are very sensitive to oxygen, being inactivated or degraded in its presence; also, photodamage may occur over time.
 The cost is not (yet) advantageous enough to compete with fossil fuels as a commercially viable source of energy.

A concern usually addressed in catalyst design is efficiency, in particular how much of the incident light can be used in a system in practice. This is comparable with photosynthetic efficiency, where light-to-chemical-energy conversion is measured. Photosynthetic organisms are able to collect about 50% of incident solar radiation, however the theoretical limit of photosynthetic efficiency is 4.6 and 6.0% for C3 and C4 plants respectively. In reality, the efficiency of photosynthesis is much lower and is usually below 1%, with some exceptions such as sugarcane in tropical climate. In contrast, the highest reported efficiency for artificial photosynthesis lab prototypes is 22.4%. However, plants are efficient in using CO2 at atmospheric concentrations, something that artificial catalysts still cannot perform.

See also 

 Bacteriorhodopsin
 ATP synthase
 Photoelectrochemistry
 AlgaePARC
 Carbon footprint
 Fuel cell
 Hydrogen economy
 List of emerging technologies
 Metabolic engineering
Photosensitizer

References

External links 
 Engineering light-activated metalloproteins to split water at Australia National University
 Daniel Nocera describes new process for storing solar energy at Massachusetts Institute of Technology.
Paul Alivisatos on Artificial Photosynthesis at Lawrence Berkeley National Laboratory
Nanocapsules for artificial photosynthesis a Nanowerk News article
MIT Solar Revolution Project

Hydrogen production
Photochemistry
Renewable energy technology
Fuel production
Emerging technologies